Malda Town High School is a higher secondary school situated at English Bazar of Malda district, in the state of West Bengal, India.

About School
This is a boys' school and is affiliated to the West Bengal Board of Secondary Education for Madhyamik Pariksha (10th Board exams), and to the West Bengal Council of Higher Secondary Education for Higher Secondary Examination (12th Board exams). The school was founded on 21 September in the year of 1949.

Location 
The school is located at South Singatala, Malda near Malda Medical College and Hospital. The nearest Railway station is Malda Town.

See also
Education in India
List of schools in India
Education in West Bengal

References

External links

Schools in Malda district
Boys' schools in India
1949 establishments in West Bengal
High schools and secondary schools in West Bengal